Pimelea leucantha is a species of flowering plant in the family Thymelaeaceae and is endemic to near-coastal areas in the west of Western Australia. It is a shrub with linear to narrowly egg-shaped or narrowly elliptic leaves and clusters of white to pale yellow flowers surrounded by 4 or 6 egg-shaped involucral bracts.

Description
Flowering occurs from August to early November.

Taxonomy
Pimelea leucantha was first formally described in 1904 by Ludwig Diels in Botanische Jahrbücher für Systematik, Pflanzengeschichte und Pflanzengeographie. The specific epithet (leucantha) means "white-flowered".

Distribution and habitat
This pimelea grows in deep sand, or in sand over rock mainly in jarrah or Banksia woodland in near coastal areas of Western Australia, from Tamala Station near Kalbarri to Nine Mile Lake Nature Reserve near Pinjarra, and extending inland as far as Three Springs, in the Avon Wheatbelt, Geraldton Sandplains, Swan Coastal Plain and Yalgoo bioregions.

Conservation status
Pimelea leucantha is listed as "not threatened" by the Government of Western Australia Department of Biodiversity, Conservation and Attractions.

References

leucantha
Malvales of Australia
Taxa named by Ludwig Diels
Plants described in 1904
Flora of Western Australia